We Are the Fury is an American rock band. 
The band was founded in Toledo, Ohio in 1999, as a nu metal band called Hearsay. The original lineup consisted of vocalist Jeremy Lublin, guitarist Chris Hatfield, bassist Alan Hoffar, and drummer Lublin. Shortly after this, the band changed their name to Hearsay TAO and started playing post-hardcore music. They added keyboardist Todd Wehrle and recorded their first album Where Vision Ends.

In 2002 they released the EP By Land, by Air, by Sleep, and would go on to change their name once again to The Fury, releasing a second self-titled EP in 2005. The name change was associated with another genre change, as the band adopted a post-punk sound. In the summer of 2005, they signed to One Big Spark Records (a Warner Bros. Records subsidiary) and had to change their name to We Are the Fury for legal reasons. The band re-released their EP as Infinite Jest through the label in 2006, and released their debut full length album, titled Venus, May 22, 2007. They were named an "Artist to Watch" by Rolling Stone in 2007.

Discography
As We Are the Fury
Infinite Jest (re-release of The Fury EP, 2006)
Venus (One Big Spark, 2007)

References

External links
Burning Stars interview with Jeremy
Burning Stars interview with Jeremy & Stephan

Indie rock musical groups from Ohio
Musical groups established in 1999
1999 establishments in Ohio